is an Ōbaku Zen temple that was built by the Chinese monk Chaonian (Chozen) in 1629 as the family temple of the Chinese from Fuzhou, Fujian Province who settled in Nagasaki.

Description
Two of its buildings have been designated as national treasures. The red entrance gate and other structures in the precincts are rare examples of the architecture of South China during the Ming dynasty. The goddess of the sea, Maso, is enshrined in the Masodo, along with other life-sized statues in the main hall. In the temple grounds is a large cauldron made by the resident priest Qianhai to cook gruel for people who were starving during the famine of 1681. The Chinese Bon Festival is held here from July 26 to 28 (by lunar calendar), with Chinese coming from all over Japan to participate in the ritual for the dead.

See also
List of National Treasures of Japan (Temples)

References

National Treasures of Japan
Buildings and structures in Nagasaki
Monuments and memorials in Japan
Obaku temples
Buddhist temples in Nagasaki Prefecture
1629 establishments in Japan
1620s establishments in Japan